Atracotoxin may refer to:

 δ-Atracotoxin (robustoxin or versutoxin)
 ω-Atracotoxin